The Queen of Spades (Pikovaya Dama), Op. 70, is the score composed by Sergei Prokofiev in 1936 for the planned but unrealized film by Mikhail Romm. The film was to be based on the 1834 short story "The Queen of Spades" by Alexander Pushkin, and was intended for release in 1937, the centenary of Pushkin's death. It is one of Prokofiev's least known pieces.

Background
The Queen of Spades was originally intended to be released on the centenary of Pushkin's death. However, the film was never finished, due to the tightening censorship in the USSR. Having signed a contract dated 29 May 1936, Prokofiev finished the piano score by 12 July, before sending it to his assistant, Pavel Lamm. When Prokofiev first played the piano reduction for Romm, Romm noted that it was neither lyrical nor dramatic, but "three and then seven pitches repeated endlessly," which added to the films "aridity," as well as conveying a sense of obsession and schizophrenia.

The 14-page piano reduction manuscript is preserved at the Russian State Archive of Literature and Art, in Moscow.

Prokofiev reused music from The Queen of Spades in the third movement of his fifth symphony, as well as in his Piano Sonata No. 8. Additional reworkings of the score have been composed by Gennady Rozhdestvensky and Michael Berkeley.

Structure
The typical performance duration is approximately 43 minutes.

Instrumentation
The Queen of Spades is scored for two flutes, two oboes, English horn, two clarinets, bass clarinet, two bassoons, four horns, three trumpets, three trombones, tuba, timpani,  bass drum, snare drum, cymbals, piano, and strings.

Movements
Overture
Wandering About
Herman in Front of the Countess's House
Liza
Herman at Home
Morning
Herman Spots Liza
Herman Delivers a Letter to Liza
Liza Reads the Letter
Liza Daydreams and Writes an Answer
Liza Goes Out with a Letter to Herman
Herman Reads the Letter; Herman in Front of the Countess's House
Herman in Liza's Room
The Ball
Liza in Her Room
Herman with Playing Cards
Visiting the Countess
Herman Takes Notes, Puts them into His Pocket, Enters the Gambling Parlour
First Winnings
Herman Enters the Gambling Parlour for the Second Time
Second Winnings
Herman Enters the Gambling Parlour for the Third Time
Herman Has Lost
Last Rendezvous

Notes

References

Films scored by Sergei Prokofiev
1936 compositions
Adaptations of works by Alexander Pushkin
Films directed by Mikhail Romm